Major General Hon. Sir Frederick Cavendish Ponsonby  (6 July 178311 January 1837) was an Anglo-Irish military officer.

Early life and education

Ponsonby was the second of three sons of Frederick Ponsonby, Viscount Dungannon (who succeeded as the 3rd Earl of Bessborough in 1793) and Henrietta Ponsonby, Countess of Bessborough. He was the brother of John Ponsonby, 4th Earl of Bessborough and William Ponsonby, 1st Baron de Mauley, and his sister was the "notorious" Lady Caroline Lamb, who married the Prime Minister Viscount Melbourne.

He was educated at Harrow.

Early career
Ponsonby joined the army as a cornet in January 1800, serving in the 10th Light Dragoons. He was promoted lieutenant in June 1800 and Captain on 20 August 1803. He exchanged to the 60th Regiment of Foot in April 1806 and served on the staff of the Duke of Bedford, then Lord Lieutenant of Ireland, and briefly for his successor, the Duke of Richmond. Promoted major on 25 June 1807, he went into the 23rd Light Dragoons on 6 August 1809 and went with them to serve in the Peninsular War.

He fought well at Talavera. He was promoted lieutenant colonel on 15 March 1810, and served as assistant adjutant-general at Buçaco and Barrosa, directing a successful charge by a squadron of the 2nd Regiment of Hussars (KGL) against the French dragoons. He was given command of the 12th Light Dragoons on 11 June 1811.

After the fall of Badajoz, he distinguished himself in the battle of Villagarcia (or Llerena) on 11 April 1812, temporarily commanding Anson's brigade. Ordered by Sir Stapleton Cotton to detain a superior force of French cavalry under Charles Lallemand, he successfully delayed them until reinforcements could arrive to flank the French and pursue them into Llerena.

He led the 12th Light Dragoons to disperse some of the broken French infantry after the Battle of Salamanca, and was wounded while covering the withdrawal from Burgos. At Vitoria, his regiment was part of the force, under Sir Thomas Graham, that blocked the French retreat towards Bayonne. He took part in the Battle of the Pyrenees and the fighting that followed in the south of France. In Paris at the time of the abdication of Napoleon as Emperor of the French, he rode through the night to bring the news to Wellington, who famously, at an inn after defeating the French at the Battle of Toulouse, snapped his fingers and turned on his heel "in a triumphal pastiche of a flamenco dance."

Waterloo Campaign
During the Waterloo Campaign, the 12th Light Dragoons were attached to Sir John Ormsby Vandeleur's light cavalry brigade. At the Battle of Waterloo, the 12th and 16th Light Dragoons were told to charge down the slope, but no further, to support the withdrawal of the Union Brigade of heavy cavalry. But, like the Union Brigade (led by his second cousin, William Ponsonby), the light horse charged (as he later admitted) too far.

Ponsonby was wounded in both arms, and knocked off his horse by another sabre cut. A French lancer saw him move where he lay and stabbed him in the back with his lance, exclaiming "Tu n'es pas mort, coquin" (You're not dead, you rascal). A French skirmisher then robbed him but luckily for Ponsonby, a Major de Laussat of the French Imperial Guard Dragoons found him and treated him kindly, giving him some brandy and promising to send help should the French prove victorious. Later, another French skirmisher used Ponsonby as a shield as he talked with him and fired over his body. Toward the end of the battle, he was ridden over by Prussian cavalry. During the night after the battle, he was roughed up by a Prussian looking for plunder, and a mortally wounded soldier of the Royal Dragoons had crawled upon Ponsonby's legs and lay dying. At last, Ponsonby was discovered by a soldier of the 40th Foot, who stood guard over him for hours until a cart became available to transport him back to Brussels.

Later career

Ponsonby went on half-pay on 26 August 1820, and was appointed "inspecting field officer" in the Ionian Islands on 20 January 1824. On 27 May 1825, he was promoted major-general, commanding the troops in the Ionian Islands. The next year, on 22 December 1826, he was appointed Governor of Malta, and remained there for eight and a half years. He met Baron de Laussat, his saviour at Waterloo, in 1827. During his Maltese tenure, he was made GCMG in 1828, and KCB and KCH in 1831. He left the governorship in May 1835 (but remained the de jure Governor until 30 September 1836), and was appointed colonel of the 86th Regiment of Foot on 4 December 1835. He was transferred to the colonelcy of the Royal Dragoons on 31 March 1836. During this period, he maintained a high degree of interest in the handling of cavalry, and corresponded with Wellington. He died suddenly at an inn, The Wellesley Arms at Murrell Green near Basingstoke, on 11January 1837 and was buried in the crypt of St Nicholas' Church, Hatherop, Gloucestershire.

In 1838, Ponsonby's Column was erected in Valletta in honour of the governor. It was destroyed by lightning in 1864.

Family
On 16 March 1825, Ponsonby married Lady Emily Charlotte (died 1877), the youngest daughter of Henry Bathurst, 3rd Earl Bathurst. They had three sons and three daughters:

Sir Henry Frederick Ponsonby (1825–1895), married Mary Elizabeth Bulteel on 30 April 1861
Alberta Victoria Ponsonby (6 May 186215 October 1945), married Major-General William Montgomery of Grey Abbey, son of Hugh Montgomery and Lady Charlotte Herbert
Magdalen Ponsonby (24 June 18641 July 1934)
John Ponsonby (25 March 186626 March 1952), married Mary Robley, daughter of Thomas Robley
Frederick Edward Grey Ponsonby (16 September 186720 October 1935), married Victoria Kennard, daughter of Edmund Hegan Kennard and Agnes Hegan and had issue
Arthur Augustus William Harry Ponsonby (16 February 187124 March 1946), married Dorothea Parry, daughter of Sir Charles Parry, 1st Bt. and Lady Elizabeth Herbert and had issue
 Lieutenant Colonel Arthur Edward Valette (3 December 182716 June 1868), married Catina Dahl
Georgina Melita Maria Ponsonby (16 February 182918 February 1895), unmarried
Harriet Julia Frances Ponsonby (27 October 183030 June 1906)
Selina Barbara Wilhelmina Ponsonby (20 January 183522 July 1919), married William Windham Baring on 2 January 1862, without issue
Frederick John Ponsonby (21 March 18373 February 1894), took holy orders and died unmarried

Notes

References

 . ONDB Endnotes:
A. Ponsonby, Henry Ponsonby, Queen Victoria's private secretary: his life from his letters (1942)
J. Ponsonby, The Ponsonby family (1929)
Earl of Bessborough and A. Aspinall, eds., Lady Bessborough and her family circle (1940)
Army List
H. T. Siborne, ed., Waterloo letters (1891)
GM, 2nd ser., 7 (1837)
The dispatches of ... the duke of Wellington ... from 1799 to 1818, ed. J. Gurwood, 13 vols. in 12 (1834–9)
Hart's Army List · W. F. P. Napier, History of the war in the Peninsula and in the south of France, 3rd edn, 6 vols. (1834–40)
D. Howarth, A near run thing (1967)
R. H. Gronow, The reminiscences of Captain Gronow, 4 vols. (1861–6)
E. A. Gray, Trumpet of glory (1985)
Cokayne, The Complete Peerage
Burke, Peerage

Further reading
Haythornthwaite, Philip J. Uniforms of Waterloo. Hippocrene, 1974.

External links

1783 births
1837 deaths
People educated at Harrow School
British Army generals
British Army personnel of the Napoleonic Wars
British Army personnel of the Peninsular War
Knights Commander of the Order of the Bath
Knights Grand Cross of the Order of St Michael and St George
Members of the Parliament of the United Kingdom for English constituencies
Members of the Parliament of the United Kingdom for County Kilkenny constituencies (1801–1922)
Frederick Cavendish Ponsonby
UK MPs 1806–1807
UK MPs 1807–1812
UK MPs 1812–1818
UK MPs 1818–1820
UK MPs 1820–1826
UK MPs 1826–1830
Younger sons of earls
10th Royal Hussars officers
12th Royal Lancers officers
Governors and Governors-General of Malta
Royal American Regiment officers
1st The Royal Dragoons officers
86th (Royal County Down) Regiment of Foot officers
Recipients of the Waterloo Medal